Vengeance may refer to:

Vengeance (concept) or revenge, a harmful action against a person or group in response to a grievance

Film 
 Vengeance (1930 film), action adventure film directed by Archie Mayo
 Vengeance (1937 film) or What Price Vengeance?, Canadian film directed by Del Lord
 Vengeance (1958 film), Spanish drama directed by Juan Antonio Bardem
 Vengeance (1968 film), Spaghetti Western by Antonio Margheriti
 Vengeance (1970 film), kung fu film directed by Chang Cheh
 Vengeance (2009 film), French-Hong Kong film directed by Johnnie To
 Vengeance (2014 film), action film starring Danny Trejo
 Vengeance (2022 film), dark comedy film written, directed, and starring B. J. Novak
 Vengeance: A Love Story, a 2017 American action thriller film
 The Vengeance Trilogy, series of three South Korean films directed by Park Chan-wook
 Vengeance, the working title of the 2022 film The Batman

Literature 
 Vengeance (comics), a fictional character in the Marvel Comics universe
 Vengeance (novel), a 2002 novel by Scott Ciencin and Dan Jolley, based on the TV series Angel
 Vengeance (Jonas book), a 1984 book by George Jonas
 The Vengeance (A Tale of Two Cities), a character in the 1859 novel A Tale of Two Cities by Charles Dickens

Military 
 Vengeance (letter of marque), an American ship captured by the Royal Navy in 1813 and renamed HMS Telegraph
 HMS Vengeance, eight vessels of the British Royal Navy
 , several ships of the French Navy
 , two ships of the United States Navy
 Vultee A-31 Vengeance, an American dive bomber of the Second World War

Music

Performers 
 Vengeance (band), a Dutch heavy metal band, or their eponymous debut album
 Vengeance Rising (previously Vengeance), an American Christian thrash metal band

Albums 
 Vengeance (Mystic Prophecy album), 2001
 Vengeance (New Model Army album), 1984
 Vengeance (Nonpoint album), 2007
 Vengeance (EP), by Young Wicked, 2016

Songs 
 "Vengeance" (Carly Simon song), 1979
 "Vengeance" (Denzel Curry song), 2018
 "Vengeance", by Before the Dawn from 4:17 am
 "Vengeance", by Converge from No Heroes
 "Vengeance", by the Devil Wears Prada from Dead Throne
 "Vengeance", by the Protomen from The Protomen
 "Vengeance", by Trivium from The Crusade
 "Vengeance", by Woe, Is Me from Numbers
 "Vengeance", by Yngwie Malmsteen from Magnum Opus
 "Vengeance", by Zack Hemsey, used in several films or trailers
 "Vengeance (The Pact)", by Blue Öyster Cult from Fire of Unknown Origin
 "We Have Awakened (Vengeance)", by the Killing Tree from We Sing Sin

Television 
 "Vengeance" (CSI: Miami), an episode of CSI: Miami
 "Vengeance" (The Killing), an episode of The Killing
 "Vengeance" (Mortal Kombat: Konquest), an episode of Mortal Kombat: Konquest
"Vengeance" (Queen of Swords), an episode of Queen of Swords
 "Vengeance" (Stargate Atlantis), an episode of Stargate Atlantis
 WWE Vengeance, an annual professional wrestling pay-per-view event produced by WWE

Other uses 
 Tribes: Vengeance, a 2004 video game
 Zacky Vengeance (born 1981), American musician, member of Avenged Sevenfold

See also
 Avenger (disambiguation)
 Reprisal, a limited and deliberate violation of international law to punish another sovereign state
 Reprisal (novel), a 1991 novel in The Adversary Cycle by F. Paul Wilson
 Retaliation (disambiguation)
 Retorsion, in international law, an act perpetrated by one nation upon another in retaliation for a similar act perpetrated by the other nation
 Retribution (disambiguation)
 Revenge (disambiguation)